Larry John Hornung (November 10, 1945 – May 8, 2001) was a Canadian professional ice hockey player who played 48 games in the National Hockey League and 371 games in the World Hockey Association. He was born in Gravelbourg, Saskatchewan and played for the Winnipeg Jets, Edmonton Oilers, San Diego Mariners of the WHA and the St. Louis Blues of the NHL.

Larry Hornung died in Regina, Saskatchewan at the age of 55, after suffering from cancer for a year.

External links

Obituary at LostHockey.com

1945 births
2001 deaths
Arizona Coyotes scouts
Canadian ice hockey defencemen
Edmonton Oilers (WHA) players
Ice hockey people from Saskatchewan
People from Gravelbourg, Saskatchewan
St. Louis Blues players
San Diego Mariners players
Toronto Maple Leafs scouts
Winnipeg Jets (1972–1996) scouts
Winnipeg Jets (WHA) players